State Highway 164 (abbreviated SH-164) is a state highway in north-central Oklahoma. It runs from SH-74 in Covington to U.S. Route 77 (US-77) west of Perry. It has no lettered spur routes.

The route of SH-164 was initially served by US-64. The highway was assigned the SH-164 designation when US-64 was realigned around 1971.

Route description
SH-164 begins on the southern fringes of Covington at a junction with SH-74. The highway heads east-southeast from this point, paralleling a rail line. The highway then crosses from Garfield County into Noble County. Just after entering Noble County, it runs along the north outskirts of Lucien. The road then continues on a due east course before ending at US-77 west of Perry.

History
SH-164 was originally part of US-64. US-64 and SH-15 proceeded east out of Enid until reaching SH-74, where SH-15 turned north and US-64 turned south. After following SH-74 to Covington, US-64 turned east, following present-day SH-164 east to US-77. From there, it followed US-77 into Perry.

By 1972, US-64 had been realigned, continuing due east from SH-74 rather than forming a concurrency with it. Instead, it continued east to I-35, following it south to Perry. The old alignment of US-64 between Perry and Covington then became SH-164.

Junction list

References

External links

SH-164 at OKHighways

164
U.S. Route 64
Transportation in Garfield County, Oklahoma
Transportation in Noble County, Oklahoma